The Cardinal of Milan may refer to:

 Stefano Nardini (d. 1484), Archbishop of Milan 1461–84, Cardinal 1473-84
 Giovanni Arcimboldi (d. 1488), Archbishop of Milan 1484–88, Cardinal 1473-84